Amuowghli-ye Olya (also Romanized as ‘Amūowghlī-ye ‘Olyā; also known as ‘Amū Owghlī-ye ‘Abbāslū) is a village in Charuymaq-e Sharqi Rural District, Shadian District, Charuymaq County, East Azerbaijan Province, Iran. At the 2006 census, its population was 240, in 38 families.

References 

Populated places in Charuymaq County